Sebastiano Pisani (1606–1670) was a Roman Catholic prelate who served as Titular Archbishop of Thessalonica (1669–1670), Bishop of Verona (1653–1668) and Bishop of Ceneda (1639–1653).

Biography
Sebastiano Pisani was born in Venice, Italy in 1606 and ordained a priest in 1639.
On 19 December 1639, he was appointed during the papacy of Pope Urban VIII as Bishop of Ceneda.
On 27 December 1639, he was consecrated bishop by Guido Bentivoglio d'Aragona, Cardinal-Priest of Santa Maria in Trastevere, with Giovanni Battista Altieri, Bishop Emeritus of Camerino, and Marcantonio Bragadin, Bishop of Vicenza, serving as co-consecrators. 
On 6 October 1653, he was appointed during the papacy of Pope Innocent X as Bishop of Verona.
He served as Bishop of Verona until his resignation on 9 December 1668. 
On 14 January 1669, he was appointed during the papacy of Pope Clement IX as Titular Archbishop of Thessalonica.
He died in 1670.

Episcopal succession
While bishop, he was the principal co-consecrator of:
Giovanni Quirino, Archbishop of Candia (1645); and 
Giovanni Camponeschi, Bishop of Termia (1645).

References

External links and additional sources
 (for Chronology of Bishops) 
 (for Chronology of Bishops) 
 (for Chronology of Bishops) 
 (for Chronology of Bishops) 
 (for Chronology of Bishops (for Chronology of Bishops) 
 (for Chronology of Bishops (for Chronology of Bishops) 

17th-century Roman Catholic bishops in the Republic of Venice
17th-century Italian Roman Catholic archbishops
Bishops appointed by Pope Urban VIII
Bishops appointed by Pope Innocent X
Bishops appointed by Pope Clement IX
1606 births
1670 deaths